John Colohan may refer to:

 John Colahan (1836–?), Surgeon Major General in the British Army
 John Fallon Colohan, Ireland's first motorist